Ampedus is a genus of click beetles in the family Elateridae. There are currently 461 recognized species of Ampedus beetles. It has a cosmopolitan distribution, but is found mostly in the Holarctic region, primarily in North America, Europe, and Asia. The oldest known fossil from this genus was found in Eocene Baltic amber, estimated to be from 38.0–33.9 million years ago.

Natural history

Life cycle 
Ampedus larvae burrow in rotting wood, pupating in mid-summer. The larvae feed on wood, with a preference for wood in more advanced stages of decay, and are also observed to be cannibalistic on other saproxylic larvae. They emerge as adults a few weeks later, but remain in the pupal cell through the following winter. Adult Ampedus beetles are thought to be diurnal. As adults, they are pollen-feeders, found in large numbers on flowers and vegetation. Ampedus females attract males for mating through chemical communication, using specialized pheromone glands, and lay their eggs in fallen wood to develop. Life cycle duration has been estimated to range from less than one year for smaller species, to up to 4-5 years for larger ones.

Habitat 
Ampedus beetles are primarily found in temperate forests, with a preference for higher altitudes. They are generalists, with a single species often found in both hardwood and softwood, and on multiple different tree species. In North America, they are most commonly collected from deciduous forests in the East and from coniferous forests in the West.

Description 
North American species of Ampedus beetles vary in size from 3-4mm, up to 13-14mm. Their coloration is variable, even within species, but they are often bicolored. They can be identified by their complete, downturned, rounded frontal carina, and excavated prosternal sutures. Like the larvae of other Elaterids (wireworms), Ampedus larvae are elongate, hard, and subcyclindrical. The ninth abdominal segment, which varies in shape between elaterid larvae, is rounded in this genus, ending in a sharp point. Ampedus larvae have pointed nasales, featuring a single tooth.

Taxonomy 
The genus was originally named by the French entomologist Pierre François Marie Auguste Dejean in 1833, previously Elater. One taxonomic study of the genera within the tribe Ampedini, which used nuclear and mitochondrial data, found monophyly of Ampedus to be highly supported. Another molecular study using DNA barcoding data found Ampedus to be paraphyletic, with the genus Reitterelator nested within it. Megapenthes is the most closely related North American genus to Ampedus.

Conservation status 
According to the IUCN Red List, multiple species of European Ampedus beetles are considered endangered, mostly due to the threats posed by logging and wood harvesting to saproxylic beetles. They are also negatively impacted by salvage logging, the practice of removing wind-thrown trees after storms and other natural disturbances.

Species 

 Ampedus aethiops (Lacordaire, 1835)
 Ampedus amamiensis Ôhira, 1968
 Ampedus anthracinus (LeConte, 1869)
 Ampedus apicalis (Reitter, 1889)
 Ampedus apicatus (Say, 1834)
 Ampedus areolatus (Say, 1823)
 Ampedus aritai Ohira & SatO, 1964
 Ampedus assingi Schimmel, 1996
 Ampedus atripennis (Horn, 1871)
 Ampedus azurescens (Candeze, 1865)
 Ampedus balcanicus Dolin, 1983
 Ampedus balteatus (Linnaeus, 1758)
 Ampedus behrensi (Horn, 1871)
 Ampedus brevis (Van Dyke, 1932)
 Ampedus callegarii Platia & Gudenzi, 2000
 Ampedus canalicollis (Lewis, 1894)
 Ampedus canaliculatus (Reitter, 1918)
 Ampedus carbonicolor (Eschscholtz, 1829)
 Ampedus carbunculus (Lewis, 1879)
 Ampedus cardinalis (Schiödte, 1865)
 Ampedus carinthiacus Bouwer, 1984
 Ampedus cinnaberinus (Eschscholtz, 1829)
 Ampedus coenobita (Costa, 1881)
 Ampedus collaris (Say, 1825)
 Ampedus cordifer (LeConte, 1859)
 Ampedus fastus (LeConte, 1884)
 Ampedus forticornis (Schwarz, 1900)
 Ampedus francolinus Bouwer, 1984
 Ampedus fuentei Sanchez-Ruiz, 1996
 Ampedus fuscatus (Melsheimer, 1846)
 Ampedus glycereus (Herbst, 1784)
 Ampedus hispanicus Platia & Gudenzi, 1999
 Ampedus hypogastricus (Candèze,1873)
 Ampedus impressicollis Bouwer, 1984
 Ampedus japonicus Silfverberg, 1977
 Ampedus karneri Schimmel, 1996
 Ampedus koschwitzi Schimmel, 1990
 Ampedus laesus (LeConte, 1853)
 Ampedus linteus (Say, 1839)
 Ampedus luctuosus (LeConte, 1853)
 Ampedus macedonicus Schimmel, 1996
 Ampedus magistrettii Platia & Schimmel, 1988
 Ampedus mannerheimi  Suzuki, 2013
 Ampedus melanotoides Brown, 1933
 Ampedus melsheimeri (Leng, 1918)
 Ampedus militaris (Harris, 1836)
 Ampedus minos Wurst, 1997
 Ampedus mixtus (Herbst, 1806)
 Ampedus moerens (LeConte, 1861)
 Ampedus nigricans Germar, 1844
 Ampedus nigricollis (Herbst, 1806)
 Ampedus nigrinus (Herbst, 1784)
 Ampedus nigroflavus (Goeze, 1777)
 Ampedus occidentalis Lane, 1971
 Ampedus ochrinulus (Reitter, 1887)
 Ampedus ochropterus Germar, 1844
 Ampedus ogatai Kishii, 1983
 Ampedus optabilis (Lewis, 1894)
 Ampedus oregonus (Schaeffer, 1916)
 Ampedus orientalis (Lewis, 1894)
 Ampedus patricius (Gurjeva, 1957)
 Ampedus pauxillus (Lewis, 1894)
 Ampedus phelpsii (Horn 1874)
 Ampedus phoenicopterus Germar, 1844
 Ampedus pomonae (Stephens, 1830)
 Ampedus pomorum (Herbst, 1784)
 Ampedus pooti Wurst, 1995
 Ampedus praeustus (Fabricius, 1792)
 Ampedus pulcher (Baudi, 1871)
 Ampedus pullus Germar, 1844
 Ampedus puniceus (Lewis, 1879)
 Ampedus pusio Germar, 1844
 Ampedus pyrenaeus Zeising, 1981
 Ampedus quadrisignatus (Gyllenhal, 1817)
 Ampedus quebecensis Brown, 1933
 Ampedus rhodopus (LeConte, 1857)
 Ampedus rubricollis (Herbst, 1806)
 Ampedus rubricus (Say, 1825)
 Ampedus rugosus Schimmel, 1982
 Ampedus sanguineus (Linnaeus, 1758)
 Ampedus sanguinipennis (Say, 1823)
 Ampedus sanguinolentus (Schrank, 1776)
 Ampedus sayi (LeConte, 1853)
 Ampedus sellatus (Leng, 1918)
 Ampedus semicinctus (Randall, 1838)
 Ampedus sinuatus Germar, 1844
 Ampedus soboensis Ohira, 1963
 Ampedus subcostatus (Kolbe, 1886)
 Ampedus talamellii Platia & Gudenzi, 2000
 Ampedus tamba Kishii, 1976
 Ampedus tenuistriatus (Lewis, 1894)
 Ampedus tokugoensis W. Suzuki, 1985
 Ampedus tristis (Linnaeus, 1758)
 Ampedus vandalitae Lohse, 1976
 Ampedus varipilis (Van Dyke, 1932)
 Ampedus vitiosus (LeConte, 1853)
 Ampedus xanthomus Germar, 1844
 Ampedus ziegleri Zeising & Sieg, 1983
 † Ampedus seyfriedii Heer, 1847

References

Further reading

External links

 

Elaterinae